= Jorge Fernández Granados =

Mexican poet

Jorge Fernández Granados (born in Mexico City, 31 October 1965) is a Mexican poet. He is a recipient of the Carlos Pellicer Iberoamerican Poetry Award and the Jaime Sabines International Prize.
